Women in Housing and Finance (WHF) is a membership organization of professionals in the area of housing and finance located in the greater metropolitan area of New York City.  Founded in 1981, WHF promotes and supports the professional growth of women in housing, finance and development and provides a vehicle through which members share knowledge and experience.

History

WHF Founder Cynthia Lewis was living in Washington, DC, working at the Department of Housing and Urban Development (HUD), during the Carter years, a very heady time for women.  Many were appointed to high level jobs in the Administration. The Washington Women's Network held meetings in the Grand Ballroom of the Washington Hilton and hundreds of "power women", and some not-so-powerful, believed that a new era had begun for women. HUD had its share with Secretary Pat Harris and Assistant Secretary Donna Shalala.

Lewis was invited to join a new group called Women in Housing and Finance, composed of women from government agencies, Capitol Hill staff, and local law firms.  She recently had been put in charge of a regulatory program and was able to make the contacts she needed through the group.

Late in 1979, Lewis came back to New York to work at the Federal Deposit Insurance Corporation (FDIC) and she felt very isolated.  With her responsibility for enforcement of the Community Investment Act, Lewis needed to meet people in the field.  So she started to talk to women she met about the need for an "old girls' network".  Lewis finally realized that it never would happen unless she did something herself. So Lewis started recruiting.

Connie Gibson, from the New Jersey Mortgage Finance Agency (NJMFA), spoke at a conference Lewis attended at Citibank.  Lewis asked her if she would be interested in a women's networking group; she was.  Lewis had met Anita Miller when, as Acting Chair of the Federal Home Loan Bank Board (FHLBB), she spoke at WHF Washington.  She was back in New York at the Ford Foundation and thought it would be a good idea.  Lewis also talked to Fran Levenson (Goldome Bank), Harriette Silverberg (Metlife), Kathy Wylde (Anchor Savings Bank), Lois Kleinerman (New York State Division of Housing and Community Renewal (DHCR)), Beverly Wettenstein (Federal Home Loan Bank Board (FHLBB)), Carla Lerman (Bergen County Housing Authority), Jean Lerman (New York City Housing Preservation and Development (HPD)), and Kay Bergin (Neighborhood Reinvestment Corporation).

They all got together in Lewis's living room in the fall of 1980.  They decided that they should each call ten women and invite them to a luncheon meeting to discuss forming a new organization.  About 50 women came, and it was clear that they were on our way.  Lewis suggested that they affiliate with WHF Washington because it was an established group.  That is how WHF got its name.  Periodically, WHF discussed changing the name, but the Board of Directors always decides that, although WHF welcomes men members, it wants to keep its original identity.

WHF began officially with a luncheon on January 16, 1981, at McGraw-Hill. Caryl Austrian, President of WHF Washington, and Anita Miller (then with the Ford Foundation) were the speakers. Beverly Wettenstein notified the media of the event.

On February 4, Cynthia Lewis and the other "founding mothers" — Kay Bergin, Jean Lerman, Harriette Silverberg, Connie Gibson, Dana Cahoon, Lois Kleinerman Bernstein, Beverly Wettenstein, Fran Levenson, and Kathy Wylde — met and formed a steering committee to draft a statement of purpose, by-laws, and membership criteria which required a "level of professionalism consistent with retaining active participation of high-level women."

This task was completed by August. The first slate of candidates included President Cynthia Lewis, First Vice President Connie Gibson, Second Vice President Fran Levenson, Secretary Lois Bernstein, and Treasurer Mary Williams. They were elected unanimously in October 1981, together with board members Kay Bergin, Martha Lamar, Carla Lerman, Jean Lerman, Anita Miller, Harriette Silverberg, Beverly Wettenstein, and Kathy Wylde. The members approved the By-laws and an annual budget of $5,000.

Membership

WHF's membership is a diversified group of accomplished individuals drawn from all aspects of housing and finance throughout New York, New Jersey and Connecticut.  Members are engaged in architecture, banking, law, development, construction, brokerage, investment banking, marketing and sales, municipal finance, accounting, property management, historic preservation and more.  Members come from the private sector, from state, local and federal agencies, and from not-for-profit organizations and community groups.

In 1997, a core group of professionals launched a vibrant New Jersey chapter which presents programs of statewide interest. More recently, WHF added a Westchester/Connecticut chapter which has held several interesting and timely events.

Membership has changed over the years.  WHF also periodically discusses becoming more public and aggressively recruiting new members, but it seems that most members prefer keeping the group at roughly the same size.  About 20% of membership changes each year, but it remains around 160–190.

Programs

WHF has been a central resource for women in the housing and finance industry throughout the New York area.  Since its inception, as market cycles have come and gone, WHF has endeavored to present up to the minute information, networking opportunities and professional development for its members.

Programs are scheduled monthly during breakfast, lunch or early evening times.  Speakers and panelists include leaders in their fields as well as key public policy makers.  WHF also hosts professional development programs in small group settings.  These are scheduled to meet the needs of members.

Programs are frequently planned in conjunction with other New York City groups with similar missions, including: Women in Transportation, Women in Real Estate, Women's City Club, the Natural Resources Defense Council, Citizens Housing and Planning Council (CHPC), MOMA, Furman Center for Real Estate and Urban Policy and The New-York Historical Society.

Recent programs have included the following:

Affordable Housing Roundtable
Green Buildings (US Green Building Council, New York)
Leadership in Energy and Environmental Design for Neighborhood Development (LEED-ND) (Natural Resources Defense Council)
American Recovery and Reinvestment Act
Homeowner Affordability and Stability Plan (Citizens Housing and Planning Council)
Home Delivery, Fabricating the Modern Dwelling (MOMA)
Brownfield Opportunity Act (New Partners for Community Revitalization)
Local Effects of the Foreclosure Crisis in New York City (Furman Center for Real Estate and Urban Policy)

Networking

Supplementing regular programming, WHF sponsors a series of seasonal events enhancing opportunities for members to meet and get to know each other in informal social settings.  These events include a colorful autumn gathering to greet new members, a January holiday party, a behind the scenes springtime field trip that explores locales not often available to the general public and a summer dinner for WHF's annual membership meeting to conclude the WHF year.  Guests and speakers have included Elinor Guggenheimer, Alair Townsend, Carol Bellamy, Claire Shulman, Charles Schumer and New York City's Mayor Michael Bloomberg.

To further fulfill its mission to promote the professional development of its members, WHF maintains a job bank with an updated list of positions available in New York, New Jersey, and Connecticut.

WHF is a member of The New York Women's Agenda.

References

External links
Women in Housing and Finance, NYC
Women in Housing and Finance, Washington DC

Women's organizations based in the United States
Business organizations based in the United States
Organizations based in New York City
1981 establishments in New York City
Housing in the United States
Organizations established in 1981